LTD is the second mini album, or EP, by Buck-Tick, released only on vinyl on March 11, 1998. Its content is nearly identical to the "Sasayaki" single, the only difference being two more songs ("Kimi ga Shin.. Dara" & "Sexy Stream Liner").

Track listing

Side A 
 "Kimi ga Shin.. Dara" (キミガシン..ダラ; When...You Die)
 "Sexy Stream Liner"
 "Sasayaki" (囁き; Whisper) remixed by Hitoshi Hiruma

Side B 
 "Thanatos -The Japanic Pig Mix-" (タナトス-The Japanic Pig Mix-) remixed by Raymond Watts (PIG)
 "My Fuckin' Valentine -Enemy (Full)-" remixed by Günter Schulz (KMFDM)
 "Schiz・o Gensou -The Spiderman Mix-" (Schiz・o 幻想 -The Spiderman Mix-) remixed by Daniel Ash (Love and Rockets)

References 

Buck-Tick albums
1998 EPs
Mercury Records EPs
Japanese-language EPs